Paglu (English: Mad) is a 2011 Indian Bengali-language romantic action film directed by Rajib Biswas. The film is a remake of the 2006 Telugu film Devadasu. The film stars Dev, Koel Mallick and Rajatava Dutta in lead roles, and follows the story of how a college student falls in love with a non resident Indian girl. The film was declared as  all time blockbuster at the box office and broke the collection of Saathi (2002) and was the highest grossing Bengali movie of all time until Chander Pahar released.

Paglu marked the third collaboration of Dev with Koel Mallick following their previous hits Premer Kahini (2008), Mon Mane Na (2008) and Bolo Na Tumi Aamar (2010). The film is the first instalment of the Paglu franchise. The song from Paglu, "Paglu Thoda Sa Karle Romance" became a hit among youngsters and topped the Bengali Music Charts.

Paglu was theatrically released in India on 3 June 2011. The film became a financial success, emerging as one of the highest grossing Bengali movies of all time, with a lifetime collection of ₹ 8.8 to ₹9.95 crore.

Plot
The film begins with Dev (Dev),a college student, meeting Rimi (Koel Mallick)– a girl who comes from the U.S. to take admission in 'Princeton' College for completing papers. She becomes a matter of rivalry between Dev and his rival in college, Ronnie, whom Dev defeats in a challenge and wins over Rimi.
Rimi’s father, a Senator in the U.S (Rajatava Dutta), arrives in town and takes her back to the U.S on the pretext of celebrating her birthday. He separates the couple, but they vow to get back to each other.
Dev's visa is rejected so he organizes a public rally and pleads his love for Rimi which helps him to get his visa.
Once he is in the U.S., he starts a game with Rimi’s father which sees Dev laying down a challenge to him and also sees Dev getting beaten up by his security guards. He returns and takes Rimi away with him, but later Rimi goes back to her house. The film concludes with Dev going back to India and Rimi joining him there.

Cast
Dev as Dev aka Paglu
 Koel Mallick as Rimi
 Rajatava Dutta as Rimi's Father, a reputed personality of the United States 
 Tulika Basu as Rimi's mother
 Partha Sarathi Chakraborty as Dev's friend
 Pradip Dhar
 RJ Sayan as Dev's friend.
 Titas Bhowmik

Soundtrack

Release
Paglu was released theatrically on 3 June 2011 to mixed reviews and received a favourable audience response.

Sequel 

Following the success of Paglu, Paglu 2 was made and released in 2012. Although the two films have different plots and characters, the film is considered the second installment in the Paglu franchise that began with Paglu. The second installment, Paglu 2 was also a hit.

References

Bengali-language Indian films
Bengali remakes of Telugu films
Films directed by Rajiv Kumar Biswas
Films scored by Jeet Ganguly